TÅGAB (Tågåkeriet i Bergslagen AB) is a Swedish railway company with headquarters in Kristinehamn. It was started in 1994 and runs trains in both Sweden and Norway.

In 1999, two locomotives (of type SJ T43 and TMY) from the company were painted in the colors of the U.S. Great Northern Railway to participate in Lars von Trier's film Dancer in the Dark, which was set in the United States but filmed in Sweden.

References

External links 
 http://www.tagakeriet.se/
 http://www.nohab.hu/tagabpics.html

Railway companies of Sweden
Swedish companies established in 1994
Railway companies established in 1994
Companies based in Värmland County